The Art of Losing (original French title: L'Art de perdre) is a 2017 novel by Alice Zeniter, translated from French to English by Frank Wynne, which won the International Dublin Literary Award in 2022. The novel demystifies the Algerian War. It is Zeniter's fifth book and the second translated in English. The Art of Losing is also the recipient of the 2017 Prix Goncourt des Lycéens, Porte Dorée Literary Prize and Le Monde’s Literary Prize.

References 

2017 French novels
Prix Goncourt des lycéens winners